Little Richard (titled Volume 2 in the UK) is the second album by American musician Little Richard, released in July 1958, ten months after Richard announced a retirement from rock and roll to pursue a life in the ministry. Like his first album, it largely contains previously released A-sides and B-sides including several which reached [[Billboard (magazine)|Billboard'''s]] Rhythm & Blues and Hot 100 charts. Nine of its twelve tracks charted in the US including Richard's fourth million-seller "Lucille", the rock and roll standard "Good Golly, Miss Molly" and  "The Girl Can't Help It", the title song from the motion picture of the same name. Among the previously unreleased tracks are two Tin Pan Alley songs recorded in Richard's frantic style.
Critical reviews

Reviewing Little Richard upon its release, Billboard praised the album as "a worthy successor to Here's Little Richard", commenting "the cat is at his frantic best" Cash Box described the album as "in typical explosive
Richard style".

Among retrospective reviews, AllMusic's Mark Deming considered Little Richard'' "every bit as rockin' as his first album, if not more so... there isn't a single throwaway among the 12 tunes on deck".

Track listing
Side one
 "Keep A Knockin'" (Richard Penniman)
 "By the Light of the Silvery Moon" (Gus Edwards, Edward Madden)
 "Send Me Some Lovin'" (John Marascalco, Leo Price)
 "I'll Never Let You Go (Boo Hoo Hoo Hoo)" (Penniman)
 "Heeby-Jeebies" (Maybelle Jackson, Marascalco)
 "All Around the World" (Robert Blackwell, McKinley Millet)

Side two
 "Good Golly, Miss Molly" (Blackwell, Marascalco)
 "Baby Face" (Harry Akst, Benny Davis)
 "Hey-Hey-Hey-Hey" (Penniman)
 "Ooh! My Soul" (Penniman)
 "The Girl Can't Help It" (Bobby Troup)
 "Lucille" (Al Collins, Penniman)

Charts

Weekly

Singles

References

1958 albums
Little Richard albums
Specialty Records albums
Albums produced by Robert Blackwell